Johann Joseph Dömling (13 January 1771 – 7 March 1803) was a German physician and professor of physiology at the University of Würzburg.

Early life and education 

Dömling, whose last name is also spelled Doemling, was born in Merkershausen. After Erthal's 1795 death, he planned a move to Hamburg with the goal of becoming a naval surgeon in England, but continued his studies when the new prince-bishop, Georg Karl Ignaz von Fechenbach zu Laudenbach, continued to support him financially. Dömling received a doctorate of the philosophical faculty on 6 September 1793 and a doctorate in medicine on 23 June 1797. His medical thesis was Dissertatio inauguralis sistens morborum gastricorum acutorum pathologiam and his advisor was Carl Caspar von Siebold.

Academic career and death 
He travelled on a study tour to Vienna and other cities in the Holy Roman Empire, meeting various famous physicians of his time. He succeeded  (died 1798) as professor of physiology in Würzburg in 1799. Dömling, who had originally supported a mechanistic physiology, became a proponent of romantic natural philosophy. His textbook  appeared in Göttingen in two volumes in 1802 and 1803. Dömling was the first to suggest a normal endogenous presence of carbon monoxide in 1803. 

He died at the age of 32 from an infection, but it was rumoured that he had been murdered.

Works

Doemling, Johann Joseph (1798). Ist die Leber Reinigungsorgan? Is the liver a purifying organ? (in German). 
Doemling, Johann Joseph (1800). Giebt es ursprüngliche Krankheiten der Säfte, welche sind es, und welche sind es nicht?. Are there original diseases of the juices, which are they and which are not? (in German) 

Doemling, Johann Joseph (1803). Archiv für die Theorie der Heilkunde. Archive for the theory of medicine. (in German)

References

External links 
Doemling, J J at   
Johann Joseph Dömling at wuerzburgwiki.de 

1771 births
1803 deaths
University of Würzburg alumni
Academic staff of the University of Würzburg